Lucero is a Spanish surname. Notable people with the surname include:

Adrián Lucero (born 1984), Argentine footballer
Alfredo Lucero (born 1979), Argentine cyclist
Anna Larroucau Laborde de Lucero (1864 – 1956), French philanthropist and educator
Anthony Lucero (born 1967), American poet
Anthony Lucero (director), American film director and visual effects editor
Armando Lucero (1942 – 2010), Argentine suspect
Ariel Lucero (born 1999), Argentine footballer
Beatriz Lucero Lhuillier, (born Beatriz Lucero, 1972), American taekwondoist
Carla Lucero, American composer/librettist
Carla Lucero (tennis) (born 1990), Argentine tennis player
Carlos F. Lucero (born 1940), American judge 
Cristian Lucero (footballer, born 1987), Argentine footballer
Cristian Lucero (footballer, born 1988), Argentine footballer
Diego Rodríguez de Lucero, inquisitor based in Córdoba between 1499 and 1507
Ed Lucero, American kayaker
Eduardo Lucero, Mexican fashion designer
Emanuel Lucero (born 1995), Argentine footballer 
Emmanuel Lucero (born 1978), Mexican boxer
Enrique Lucero (1920 – 1989), Mexican film actor
Eric Lucero (born 1977/1978), American politician
Evelina Zuni Lucero, Native American writer
Georgina Zapata Lucero (born 1981), Mexican politician
Isaías Lucero, Mexican singer
Jesús Lucero, Mexican paralympic athlete
Juan Manuel Lucero (born 1985), Argentine footballer
Juan Martín Lucero (born 1991), Argentine footballer
Judy Lucero, prisoner poet
Karol Lucero (born 1987), Chilean entertainer
Marcelo Lucero (born 1980), Chilean footballer
Martín Lucero (born 1990), Argentine footballer
Michael Lucero (1963 – 1998), American music video director
Michael Lucero (sculptor) (1953–), American artist
Pablo Lucero (c. 1800 - 1856), Argentine politician
Richard Lucero (born 1934), mayor from New Mexico
Robert Edward Lucero, Philippine Army officer
Roberto Lucero (born 1966), Argentine biathlete
Santiago Lucero (1904 – ??), Filipino politician
Sid Lucero (born 1981), Filipino television and film actor
Wendy Lucero-Schayes (born 1963), American diver

See also
Lucero (given name)

Spanish-language surnames